Eliot Spitzer has made several attempts at public office. His first campaign was for the Democratic nomination for New York Attorney General in 1994 that was won by Karen Burstein. He won this office in 1998 and 2002, and was elected Governor of New York in 2006. 

Spitzer won a landslide victory in the 2006 election with 69% of the vote. It was the largest margin of victory in a gubernatorial race in New York history, and the second-largest for any statewide race in New York history. The only larger victory was Chuck Schumer's 71% victory in his successful reelection bid for the U.S. Senate two years earlier. Spitzer carried all but three counties in the state.

Electoral history 

Faso also ran on the Conservative Party of New York ticket.

|-

Irizzary also ran on the Conservative Party of New York ticket.

|-

Vacco also ran on the Conservative Party of New York ticket.

Bibliography
Paterson, David "Black, Blind, & In Charge: A Story of Visionary Leadership and Overcoming Adversity."Skyhorse Publishing. New York, New York, 2020

Spitzer, Eliot
Eliot Spitzer